Springhill Township may refer to one of the following townships in the United States:

Springhill Township, Hempstead County, Arkansas
Springhill Township, Wilson County, North Carolina
Springhill Township, Pennsylvania (disambiguation) (two townships)

See also

Springhill (disambiguation)

Township name disambiguation pages